Evelyn Masaiti is the Zimbabwe Deputy Minister of Women's Affairs, Gender and Community Development. She is the Member of House of Assembly for Dzivaresekwa (MDC-T).

References

Members of the National Assembly of Zimbabwe
Living people
21st-century Zimbabwean women politicians
21st-century Zimbabwean politicians
Year of birth missing (living people)